District 1 was a district in the Minnesota House of Representatives.

List of representatives

References

Minnesota House of Representatives districts